4-Methylcathinone (also known as Nor-Mephedrone, 4-MC and NSC-60487), is a stimulant drug of the cathinone chemical class that has been sold online as a designer drug. It is a metabolite of the better known drug mephedrone (4-methylmethcathinone).

4-Methylcathinone displays a 2.4-fold selectivity to promote monoamine release via DAT over SERT as opposed to 309-fold selectivity for cathinone.

See also 
 4-Methylbuphedrone
 4-Methylethcathinone

References 

Cathinones
Designer drugs
Serotonin-dopamine releasing agents